Hawara is an archaeological site of Ancient Egypt, south of the site of Crocodilopolis ('Arsinoë', also known as 'Medinet al-Faiyum') at the entrance to the depression of the Fayyum oasis. It is the site of a pyramid built by the Pharaoh Amenemhat III in the 19th century BC.

History

Amenemhat III was the last powerful ruler of the 12th Dynasty, and the pyramid he built at Hawara is believed to post-date the so-called "Black Pyramid" built by the same ruler at Dahshur. This is believed to have been Amenemhet's final resting place. At Hawara there was also the intact (pyramid) tomb of Neferu-Ptah, daughter of Amenemhet III. This tomb was found about 2 km south of the king's pyramid.

In common with the Middle Kingdom pyramids constructed after Amenemhat II, it was built of mudbrick round a core of limestone passages and burial chambers, and faced with limestone. Most of the facing stone was later pillaged for use in other buildings— a fate common to almost all of Egypt's pyramids— and today the pyramid is little more than an eroded, vaguely pyramidal mountain of mud brick, and of the once magnificent mortuary temple precinct formerly enclosed by a wall there is little left beyond the foundation bed of compacted sand and chips and shards of limestone.

The huge mortuary temple that originally stood adjacent to this pyramid is believed to have formed the basis of the complex of buildings with galleries and courtyards called a "labyrinth" by Herodotus (see quote at Labyrinth), and mentioned by Strabo and Diodorus Siculus. (There is no historicity to the assertion of Diodorus Siculus that this was the model for the labyrinth of Crete that Greeks imagined housed the Minotaur.) 

The demolition of the "labyrinth" may date in part to the reign of Ptolemy II, under whom the Pharaonic city of Shedyt (Greek Crocodilopolis, the modern Medinet el-Fayum) was renamed to honour his sister-wife Arsinoë; a massive Ptolemaic building program at Arsinoë has been suggested as the ultimate destination of Middle Kingdom limestone columns and blocks removed from Hawara, and now lost.

Pharaoh Sobekneferu of the Twelfth Dynasty also built at the complex. Her name meant "most beautiful of Sobek", the sacred crocodile.

Pyramid

From the pyramid entrance a sloping passageway with steps runs down to a small room and a further short horizontal passage. In the roof of this horizontal passage there was a concealed sliding trapdoor weighing 20 tons. If this was found and opened a robber would find himself confronted by an empty passage at a right angle to the passage below, closed by wooden doors, or by a passage parallel to the passage below, carefully filled with mud and stone blocking. He would assume that the blocking concealed the entrance and waste time removing it (thereby increasing the likelihood of detection by the pyramid guardians).

In fact there was a second 20-ton trapdoor in the roof of the empty passage, giving onto a second empty passage, also at a right angle to the first. This too had a 20-ton trapdoor giving onto a passage at a right angle to its predecessor (thus the interior of the pyramid was circled by these passages). However this passage ended in a large area of mud and stone blocking that presumably concealed the burial chamber.

This, however, was a blind and merely filled a wide but shallow alcove. Two blind shafts in the floor, carefully filled with cut stone blocks, further wasted the robbers' time, for the real entrance to the burial chamber was even more carefully concealed and lay between the blind shafts and opposite the alcove.

Despite these elaborate protective measures, Petrie found that none of the trapdoors had been slid into place and the wooden doors were open. Whether this indicated negligence on the part of the burial party, an intention to return and place further burials in the pyramid (when found there were two sarcophagi in the quartzite monolith described below and room for at least two more), or a deliberate action to facilitate robbery of the tomb, we cannot know.

The burial chamber was made out of a single quartzite monolith which was lowered into a larger chamber lined with limestone. This monolithic slab weighed an estimated 110 tons according to Petrie. A course of brick was placed on the chamber to raise the ceiling then the chamber was covered with 3 quartzite slabs (estimated weight 45 tons each). Above the burial chamber were 2 relieving chambers. This was topped with 50 ton limestone slabs forming a pointed roof. Then an enormous arch of brick 3 feet thick was built over the pointed roof to support the core of the pyramid. 

The entrance to the pyramid is today flooded to a depth of 6 metres as a result of the waters from the Bahr Yussef (Joseph's) Canal, which flows around two sides of the site and passes within 30m of the pyramid.

Excavations

The first excavations at the site were made by Karl Lepsius, in 1843. William Flinders Petrie excavated at Hawara, in 1888, finding papyri of the 1st and 2nd centuries CE, and, north of the pyramid, a vast necropolis where he found 146 portraits on coffins dating to the Roman period, famous as being among the very few surviving examples of painted portraits from classical antiquity, the "Fayum" mummy portraits from Roman Egypt. Among the discoveries made by Petrie were papyrus manuscripts, including a great papyrus scroll which contains parts of books 1 and 2 of the Iliad (the "Hawara Homer" of the Bodleian Library, Oxford).

See also
List of Egyptian pyramids
List of megalithic sites

References

External links

Monuments and Sites of Ancient Egypt: Hawara
The Hawara Papyri
The Petrie Museum of Egyptian Archaeology, University College London: A Virtual Exploration of the Lost Labyrinth
A 2000 PDF showing some 3D modelling of the labyrinth

Buildings and structures completed in the 19th century BC
Amenemhat III
Pyramids of the Twelfth Dynasty of Egypt
Archaeological sites in Egypt
Former populated places in Egypt